127 Rose Avenue is the fifty-first studio album from American musician Hank Williams, Jr. This album was released June 16, 2009 on Curb Records, his last for the label. It includes the single "Red, White & Pink Slip Blues", which peaked at #43 on the U.S. country singles charts shortly before the album's release. The album title "127 Rose Avenue" is a reference to the boyhood home of Hank  Williams Sr in Georgiana, AL.  One of the co-writers Bud McGuire was inspired after a visit to the home, whose actual address is 127 Rose Street.  The album debuted at #7 on the Billboard country chart.

Track listing

Personnel
 Eddie Bayers – drums
 Mark Catacchia – assistant engineer
 Joe Chemay – bass guitar
 Lisa Cochran – background vocals
 Perry Coleman – background vocals
 Eric Darken – jaw harp, marimba
 Paul Franklin – steel guitar
 Aubrey Haynie – fiddle
 John Barlow Jarvis – piano
 Doug Johnson – background vocals, producer, engineer
 Jelly Roll Johnson – harmonica
 Troy Johnson – background vocals
 Troy Lancaster – electric guitar
 Paul Leim – drums
 Chris Leuzinger – electric guitar
 Ken Levitan – management
 Joe Martino – assistant engineer
 Brent Mason – electric guitar
 Patrick Murphy – engineer
 John Ozier – production coordination
 Robert Randolph – steel guitar
 Scotty Sanders – steel guitar
 Ed Seay – background vocals, engineer, mixing
 Shawn Simpson – digital editing
 Bryan Sutton – acoustic guitar
 Bobby Terry – acoustic guitar, electric guitar, baritone guitar
 Steve Turner – drums
 Dennis Wage – Hammond B-3 organ
 Craig White – digital editing
 Hank Williams, Jr. – electric guitar, lead vocals, producer
 Hank Williams – mastering

Charts

Weekly charts

Year-end charts

References

2009 albums
Hank Williams Jr. albums
Curb Records albums
Albums produced by Doug Johnson (record producer)